NanoLumens Inc. is a private American corporation that designs and manufactures digital LED displays. Since its founding in 2006, it has designed products that target the market gap between consumer flat panel displays and commercial outdoor LED billboards in indoor spaces. It is best known for creating the world's first large-format flexible display, the NanoFlex 112"; but now has a full product line of fixed, indoor LED displays in any size, shape, or curvature. It is currently headquartered in Peachtree Corners, Georgia, a North Atlanta suburb.

History 
NanoLumens was launched in 2006 by then CEO Richard 'Rick' Cope. NanoLumens now holds over 200 patents on the technology used in their displays.

The company raised more than $10 million from 2006 to 2009 from angel investors to fund their operations, and primarily targets the digital out-of-home (DOOH) market, with sales in the U.S. & Canada, and expansion in Europe, the Middle East, Australia, and South America.

NanoLumens relocated its headquarters at the beginning of 2012 to a new 32,000 square foot office center in the North Atlanta suburb of Peachtree Corners after being courted by the Gwinnett Chamber Economic Development Department and the Georgia Department of Economic Development to stay in the area. The new facility houses the largest digital display showroom in the US. 2012 also marked the company's first full year of commercial production.

Key personnel

 Gary Feather, Chief Technology Officer
 Chuck Gottschalk, Chief Operating Officer
 Dave Merlino, Vice President of Sales
 Joe' Lloyd, Vice President of Global Marketing and Business Development

Product lines 
NanoLumens produces digital display solutions targeting the Digital Out-of-Home (DOOH) Market for indoor installations. Displays range from 0.93mm to 10mm pixel pitches depending on the model and can be flat, curved, or cylindrical. Markets served include broadcast facilities, the conventions/hospitality industry, casinos, educational institutions, sports venues, federal systems, transportation hubs, and retail stores.

References

Display technology companies
Privately held companies based in Georgia (U.S. state)
Technology companies established in 2006
2006 establishments in Georgia (U.S. state)
Manufacturing companies based in Georgia (U.S. state)
Companies based in Gwinnett County, Georgia